Strathewen is a town in Victoria, Australia, 45 km north-east of Melbourne's Central Business District, located within the Shire of Nillumbik local government area. Strathewen recorded a population of 198 at the 2021 census.

Strathewen is located near the Kinglake National Park. It is an apple and pear producing area and is home to small local vineyards and wineries.

History
Strathewen Post Office opened on 20 September 1909 and closed in 1964.

The town was substantially destroyed during the Black Saturday bushfires on 7 February 2009, which destroyed the primary school, the old fire station, the community hall, and most of the houses in the area. Twenty-seven of its 200 residents died in the fires.

See also
 Shire of Eltham – the former local government area of which Strathewen was a part

References

External links

Towns in Victoria (Australia)
Shire of Nillumbik